Martin Bossert from Ulm University, Ulm, Germany was named Fellow of the Institute of Electrical and Electronics Engineers (IEEE) in 2012 for contributions to reliable data transmission including code constructions and soft decision decoding.

Bossert received his Dipl.-Ing. degree in Electrical Engineering from the Technical University of Karlsruhe, Germany in 1981, and his Ph.D. from the Technische Universität Darmstadt, Germany in 1987.

References

20th-century births
Living people
Engineers from Ulm
German electronics engineers
Karlsruhe Institute of Technology alumni
Technische Universität Darmstadt alumni
Academic staff of the University of Ulm
Fellow Members of the IEEE
Year of birth missing (living people)
Place of birth missing (living people)
Members of the German Academy of Sciences Leopoldina